Gretchen Baer (born 1963, in Oak Bluffs, Massachusetts) is an American painter and performance artist living in Bisbee, Arizona.

Baer is known for painting mile-long murals on the southern side of the US-Mexico border fence in collaboration with a group of Mexican children known as the "Border Bedazzlers."

Baer is also known for her art cars, including the "Hill Car" which features a large portrait of Hillary Clinton on the hood of a 1989 Toyota, and the "Fortune Telling Lion". During the 2008 Presidential Campaign, Baer founded the Hillary Clinton Army, raising money for the presidential candidate.

Baer is known for her colorful oil paintings and her flamboyant art, political and musically themed events. She formerly ran the El-Change-O! art gallery in Bisbee, Arizona.

Books of Baer's work
 Blank, Harrod, "Wild Wheels". Blank Books, 2001. .

References

External links
 paintressgretchen.blogspot.com
 U.S. Department of State – Exchanges Connect
 The Amazing Hillary Car, or Hillcar, of Gretchen Baer! 2008
 Painting with the Czars 2010

20th-century American painters
21st-century American painters
Living people
People from Oak Bluffs, Massachusetts
1963 births
American women painters
20th-century American women artists
21st-century American women artists
People from Bisbee, Arizona